The Saldurbach is a stream located in South Tyrol, Italy. It flows into the Punibach close to its confluence with the Adige near Prad am Stilfser Joch.

References 
Civic Network of South Tyrol (in German)

Rivers of Italy
Rivers of South Tyrol